The Căian is a right tributary of the river Mureș in Romania. It discharges into the Mureș in Bejan.

References

Rivers of Hunedoara County
Rivers of Romania